John's Roast Pork is an Italian roast pork and cheesesteak eatery in South Philadelphia that was founded in 1930 at its original location on East Snyder Avenue in Philadelphia, just outside the Pennsport and Whitman neighborhoods. The eatery is considered a favorite among South Philadelphia locals and has gained mainstream recognition for its roast pork and cheesesteaks.

History

John's Roast Pork was established in 1930 and is currently being run by John Bucci Jr., the family's third generation. The restaurant is known for its short hours, historically only open from 6:45 AM to 3:00 PM. In 2013, it expanded to serving after hours at Mick Daniel's Saloon two blocks away. In 2015, John's extended its hours, opening from 7 AM to 7 PM. The restaurant currently opens from 9 AM to 7 PM Tuesday through Saturday.

Before Phillip Morris sales manager John "Butch" Gleason died, he requested to be buried with a sandwich from John's Roast Pork.

Awards

John's roast pork sandwich and sharp provolone cheesesteaks were featured in the championship finale of the Travel Channel’s Best Sandwich in America and has been described by food critic Andrew Zimmern as well-seasoned to the secret Bucci family recipe and deboned “right on premises”.

The establishment was designated as an “American Classic” for roast pork by the James Beard Foundation in 2006.

In 2014, Niki Achitoff-Gray of Serious Eats considered John's Roast Pork, the best classic roast pork sandwich in Philadelphia as well as acknowledging them for their cheesesteaks.

Television
John's Roast Pork has appeared on the television shows Adam Richman's Best Sandwich in America and on the Travel Channel.

See also
 List of submarine sandwich restaurants

References

External links
 

Submarine sandwich restaurants
Restaurants in Philadelphia
1930 establishments in Pennsylvania
Restaurants established in 1930
South Philadelphia
James Beard Foundation Award winners